The Agricultural Adjustment Act of 1980 (P.L. 96-213) amended the Food and Agriculture Act of 1977 (P.L. 95–113), primarily to raise the target prices for wheat and corn.

The H.R. 3398 legislation was passed by the 96th U.S. Congressional session and signed into law by the 39th President of the United States Jimmy Carter on March 18, 1980.

References

External links
 

United States Department of Agriculture
United States federal agriculture legislation
96th United States Congress
1980 in American law